The Beast Is Back is the seventh album by a newly reformed Blue Cheer, 13 years after their previous album, Oh! Pleasant Hope (1971). It contains re-recorded versions of some of the band's most popular songs from their late-1960s heyday as well as new material. The album features founding members Dickie Peterson and Paul Whaley. Original guitarist Leigh Stephens did not participate in the reunion.

The Beast Is Back has been released with three different album covers.

Track listing
Side one
"Nightmares" (Dickie Peterson) – 5:03
"Summertime Blues" (Jerry Capehart, Eddie Cochran) – 3:57
"Ride with Me" (Tony Rainier) – 5:25
"Girl Next Door" (Rainier) – 3:39

Side two
"Babylon" (Peterson) – 4:12
"Heart of the City" (Dr. Richard Peddicord) – 4:19
"Out of Focus" (Peterson) – 3:43
"Parchment Farm" (Mose Allison) – 6:55

Personnel
Band members
Dickie Peterson – bass, lead vocals
Tony Rainier – lead guitars, backing vocals
Paul Whaley – drums

Production
Carl Canedy, Paul Curcio - producers
Chris Bubacz - engineer
Jack Skinner - Mastering
Jon Zazula - executive producer

References

1984 albums
Blue Cheer albums
Megaforce Records albums